Maddy Turner (born 17 December 1995) is an Australian netball player in the Suncorp Super Netball league, playing for the New South Wales Swifts.

Turner was born in Adelaide and grew up playing netball at an elite level, representing Australia at under 17, 19 and 21 level and featuring in the South Australia National Under-21 Championships in 2015. This led to her being signed by the New South Wales Swifts ahead of the 2016 season, where she played every game that year for the Swifts including the narrow loss in the Grand Final to the Queensland Firebirds. She went on to win the Swifts Coaches Award in both the 2017 and 2018 seasons.

She has represented Australia in the Fast5 Netball World Series.

References

External links
 New South Wales Swifts profile
 Suncorp Super Netball profile
 Netball Draft Central profile

Living people
1995 births
Australian netball players
New South Wales Swifts players
Suncorp Super Netball players
Australian Netball League players
Southern Force (netball) players
Netball players from South Australia
Australia international Fast5 players
Contax Netball Club players
South Australian Sports Institute netball players
South Australia state netball league players
New South Wales Institute of Sport netball players
New South Wales state netball league players